Trevor William Sykes (born 14 September 1937) is an Australian finance journalist who until his retirement in 2005 wrote the Pierpont column in the Australian Financial Review.

He also wrote a number of books on prominent Australian corporate collapses and goings on.

Bibliography

References

External links
 Pierpont web site, collecting various articles etc. written by Sykes under that alter-ego

1937 births
Australian columnists
Living people
Place of birth missing (living people)